Best: The Greatest Hits of S Club 7 is a greatest hits compilation album released from S Club 7. Released on 2 June 2003, it includes all 13 singles from the band, plus a bonus track, "Everybody Get Pumped". A DVD was produced to coincide with the release and contained all 13 music videos, as well as bonus, rare unreleased interviews with the band on the release of each of their previous albums. The album peaked at number 2 on the UK Albums Chart, kept off the top spot by You Gotta Go There to Come Back by Stereophonics.

The album was re-issued on 4 May 2015, including the previously unreleased track, "Rain".

Track listing

Charts

Weekly charts

Year-end charts

Certifications and sales

Release history

References

S Club 7 albums
2003 greatest hits albums